Music in High Places: Live in Alaska is a live DVD by the Goo Goo Dolls. It features live acoustic performances of some of the band's biggest hits.

Track listing

Reception
DVD Talk said the film "offers a mixed bag. It works very well as an introduction to the scenic majesty of our northern-most state, but it fails to satisfy as a musical outing. Still, fans of the band will want to see the group playing in a totally new environment."

References

2000s English-language films